The 2018 CAF Champions League Final was the final of the 2018 CAF Champions League, the 54th edition of Africa's premier club football tournament organized by the Confederation of African Football (CAF), and the 22nd edition under the current CAF Champions League title.

The final was contested in two-legged home-and-away format between Al Ahly from Egypt and Espérance de Tunis from Tunisia. The first leg was hosted by Al-Ahly on 2 November 2018, while the second leg was hosted by Espérance de Tunis at the Stade Olympique de Radès in Radès on 9 November 2018.

Espérance de Tunis won the final 4–3 on aggregate for their third CAF Champions League title. As winners, they earned the right to represent the CAF at the 2018 FIFA Club World Cup, entering at the second round, as well as play in the 2019 CAF Super Cup against the winner of the 2018 CAF Confederation Cup.

Teams
In the following table, finals until 1996 were in the African Cup of Champions Club era, since 1997 were in the CAF Champions League era.

Background
Al-Ahly are the most successful club in Egypt and Africa with eight titles, winning eight (1982, 1987, 2001, 2005, 2006, 2008, 2012, 2013) and losing three (1983, 2007, 2017). Al-Ahly were playing their twelfth and second consecutive final.

Espérance de Tunis had reached the final six times before, more than any other Tunisian side, winning two (1994, 2011) and losing four (1999, 2000, 2010, 2012). Espérance de Tunis were playing their seventh final and the first since 2012.

The two sides had previously played 18 matches in African competitions. The first meetings between the two sides took place in the 1990 African Cup of Champions Clubs round of 16, where Espérance de Tunis beat Al-Ahly on penalties after the home and away matches ended 0–0. The most recent meetings between the clubs had taken place in the 2018 CAF Champions League group stage, where Al-Ahly's home match ended 0–0, and then Espérance de Tunis lost 0–1 at home to Al-Ahly on a Walid Azaro goal.

Venues

Borg El Arab Stadium

The Borg El Arab Stadium is a stadium commissioned in 2006 in the Mediterranean Sea resort of Borg El Arab; 25 km west of Alexandria, Egypt. It is the largest stadium in Egypt and the second largest in Africa (after FNB Stadium in Johannesburg) with a capacity of 86,000 and is an all-seater. It is also the 27th largest stadium in the world, and the 9th largest association football stadium in the world. It is located on the Cairo-Alexandria desert highway 10 km from Borg El Arab Airport and 15 km from Alexandria's city centre. A running track runs around the pitch, and the ground has four large floodlights. Only one stand is covered by a roof.

The stadium is 145 feddans, is surrounded by a fence which is 3 km long, an internal road network its long is 6 km, a parking lot which could fit 5000 cars and 200 bus beside an airstrip, there are 136 electronic entrances. The main cabin is covered by an umbrella which covers 35% of the stadium total area, and it is considered the biggest umbrella in the Middle East. Its length is 200 m, its dimension is 60 m and its area is 12,000 m2, which is equal to 3 feddans.

The stadium is air-conditioned and that condition includes the clothes chambers, the salons and entrances, also the stadium includes 8 elevators for broadcasters, handicapped, services and important persons. There are 2 sub-stadiums for training and each ground can hold 2000 spectators, includes 2 locker rooms and a stadium for Athletics. The stadium also includes a hotel for 200 guests which is air-conditioned and has a swimming pool, gym and a department building which contains 80 people. The stadium includes a building which contains 300 presses. This building includes cabinets for broadcasters, entrances for emergency, ambulance cars, 39 and cafeterias, 337 bathrooms which classified to 33 bathrooms for women and 8 bathrooms for the handicapped.

Stade Olympique de Radès

The Stade Olympique de Radès is a multi-purpose stadium in Radès, Tunisia about 10 kilometers south-east of the city center of Tunis, in the center of the Olympic City. It is currently used mostly for football matches and it also has facilities for athletics.  The stadium holds 60,000 and was built in 2001 for the 2001 Mediterranean Games  and is considered to be one of the best stadiums in Africa. The stadium was built for the 2001 Mediterranean Games, the 60,000-seat covered area covers 13,000 m2 and consists of a central area, 3 adjoining grounds, 2 warm-up rooms, 2 paintings and an official stand of 7,000 seats. The press gallery is equipped with 300 desks.

Road to the final

Note: In all results below, the score of the finalist is given first (H: home; A: away).

Format
The final was played on a home-and-away two-legged basis, with the order of legs determined by the knockout stage draw, which was held on 3 September 2018, 20:00 EET (UTC+2), at the CAF headquarters in Cairo, Egypt.

If the aggregate score was tied after the second leg, the away goals rule would be applied, and if still tied, extra time would not be played, and the penalty shoot-out would be used to determine the winner.

Matches

First leg

Statistics

Second leg

Statistics

See also
2018 CAF Confederation Cup Final
2019 CAF Super Cup

References

External links
Total Champions League 2018, CAFonline.com

2018
Final
CCL
CCL
CAF Champions League
International club association football competitions hosted by Egypt
International club association football competitions hosted by Tunisia
Sports competitions in Radès
21st century in Radès